Ajka is a district in central-western part of Veszprém County. Ajka is also the name of the town where the district seat is found. The district is located in the Central Transdanubia Statistical Region.

Geography 
Ajka District borders with Pápa District to the north, Veszprém District to the east, Tapolca District to the south, Sümeg District and Devecser District to the west. The number of the inhabited places in Ajka District is 11.

Municipalities 
The district has 1 town and 10 villages.

The bolded municipality is city.

See also
List of cities and towns in Hungary

References

External links
 Postal codes of the Ajka District

Districts in Veszprém County